was a Japanese engineer who, in 1968 along with M. Matsuishi, developed the rainflow-counting algorithm for fatigue analysis of structures while a visiting professor at the University of Illinois.

Bibliography
Murakami, Y. (1992) The Rainflow Method in Fatigue: The Tatsuo Endo Memorial Volume 

1925 births
1989 deaths
Japanese civil engineers
Japanese metallurgists
University of Illinois Urbana-Champaign faculty
Japanese expatriates in the United States